The Mediterranean Conference Centre (MCC) is a conference centre in Valletta, Malta. The building was built as a hospital in the 16th century by the Order of St. John, and it was known as the Sacra Infermeria or the Holy Infirmary. It was known as the Grand Hôspital during the French occupation of Malta and during the British period was named as the Station Hospital.

It was one of the leading hospitals in Europe until the 18th century, and it remained in use until 1920. It had a capacity to keep from 500 to 2,500 patients. The building is now used for multiple banquets, exhibitions, international conventions and theatrical shows.

History

Hospital
The Holy Infirmary was ordered to be built by Grand Master Jean de la Cassière on 7 November 1574, after a Chapter General, to replace the already existing one in Birgu. Construction instigated in the same year. It was completed towards the end of the 16th century. Its architect is not known, but it is usually attributed to Girolamo Cassar.

It was meant to receive Maltese and foreign patients, as well as to provide lodging to pilgrims travelling to the Holy Land. It also had two pharmacies. In 1596 a phalange was built, which was meant to accommodate the patients with venereal and contagious diseases. In 1636, one of the pharmacies was closed down.

During the reign of Grand Master Raphael Cotoner, the infirmary was enlarged, having more wards added. This work continued until 1666, during the reign of Raphael's successor and brother, Nicolas Cotoner. The ‘Old Ward’ was also extended. During his reign, in 1676, a School of Anatomy and Surgery was established in the infirmary itself. A dissection room was built in the infirmary due to the school, which was later on moved to the site of the graveyard outside the infirmary. More work was carried out in 1712, during the reign of Grand Master Ramon Perellos y Roccaful. These included a Quadrangle, the Chapel of the Blessed Sacrament, a laboratory and a pharmacy.

When the French, under Napoleon Bonaparte, occupied Malta in 1798, they made alterations to the hospital. They improved its ventilation, sanitation and lighting. They also changed it to a military hospital to accommodate the sick French sailors and soldiers, which resulted in the name change from Sacra Infermeria to Hopital Militaire. As soon as the Maltese insurrection began, the hospital's efficiency began to deteriorate. Supplies like medication, fresh food, water and clothing were scarce. Diseases like nightblindness, scurvy, intestinal diseases and phthisis were common. The French capitulated on 5 September 1800 and it was immediately occupied by 350 British Troops.

The new General Hospital now became a Station Hospital to accommodate the wounded British soldiers being brought in by Hospital ships. This was done due to its strategic position overlooking the harbour. This meant that the seriously injured troops could be easily and quickly transported there. The hospital saw much use mainly during the Napoleonic Wars, the Crimean War and the First World War. In effect by World War I Malta was known as the 'Nurse of the Mediterranean'. Between 1863 and 1865 more alterations were made to improve the building.

The Station Hospital was brought to an end in 1918, by the conclusion of the Great War.

Subsequent uses

From 1920 until May 1940 it served as the headquarters of the Malta Police Force. The building was included on the Antiquities List of 1925. It was evacuated during the Second World War during which it took four direct hits, which destroyed certain parts of it. After the War, the part of the 'Great Ward' which remained became a Command Hall for the Allied Troops. It remained so until 1950. Afterwards it became a Children's Theatre for a year. In 1959, the centre became a school and an examination centre. Restoration was attempted multiple times, however in 1978 a full restoration started and on 11 November 1979, the current centre was inaugurated. It was later awarded the Europa Nostra Diploma of Merit.

The centre has since housed many conferences, meetings, summits and other events, such as the Valletta Summit on Migration and the Commonwealth Heads of Government Meeting 2015.

The Sacra Infermeria is listed on the National Inventory of the Cultural Property of the Maltese Islands.

On 20 November 2016, the centre was the official venue for the Junior Eurovision Song Contest of that year

Architecture
The Sacra Infermeria originally had two wards with a central courtyard, but was subsequently enlarged to have six large wards. The main hall was once the largest hall in Europe with a length of 480 feet. It also has a monumental staircase designed in form of flight of stairs going down against a wall and then turn midway opposite the other side of the wall. The corridors and underground halls have vaulted ceilings in the form of a cross.

Further reading

References

External links

Buildings and structures in Valletta
Hospitals established in the 16th century
Hospitals disestablished in 1920
Theatres in Malta
Defunct hospitals in Malta
National Inventory of the Cultural Property of the Maltese Islands
Convention centers in Malta